Ali Lotfi (born in Esfahan) is an Iranian film director, film producer, and Animator.

Filmography: Directing
 Land of Sleep (sarzamin khab) (2012) - feature
 Final dot (2009) - short
 Red apple (Sibe sorkh) (2008) - short
 Dash feri (2010) - short
 Metro (2011) - short
 Pardis (2011) - T-shirt

Awards and honors
Ali lotfi has received numerous awards up to now. Here are a few:
Fajr 30th Tehran Film Festival, 2012.
International Children Film Festival, 2010.

External links 

 
 Soureh Cinema

Iranian film directors
Iranian screenwriters
Persian-language film directors
People from Tehran
Living people
Year of birth missing (living people)